The Hiệp Thiên Đài is the Legislative Branch of the governing body of the Cao Đài Church. The name literally means "where man communes with God".

Based on Cao Đài Law, the Cao Đài Church consists of three branches:
Cửu Trùng Đài (the Executive Branch) or (the Branch of Body), led by Giáo Tông (Pope of the Caoddaiist Church).
Hiệp Thiên Đài (the Legislative Branch) or (the Branch of Mind), headed by Hộ Pháp (Cardinals of the Caoddaiist Church). 

Theoretically, these branches are mutually run so as to produce the maximum religious power. In reality, nevertheless, only Cửu Trùng Đài and Hiệp Thiên Đài can launch secular or religious activities, so all Cao Đài dignitaries work for or in these two branches. More characterized by spiritual features, Bát Quái Đài is where God reigns.

Hierarchy
It is stipulated by the Constitution of Hiệp Thiên Đài that the top-ranking dignitary be Hộ Pháp, assisted by Thượng Sanh and Thượng Phẩm. Hộ Pháp, hượng Sanh and Thượng Phẩm also lead three divisions each of which includes four other dignitaries called Thời Quân as follows.  
Hộ Pháp – Bảo Pháp – Hiến Pháp – Khai Pháp – Tiếp Pháp
Thượng Phẩm - Bảo Đạo – Hiến Đạo – Khai Đạo – Tiếp Đạo
Thượng Sanh - Bảo Thế  – Hiến Thế – Khai Thế  – Tiếp Thế

Directly under those are the lower-ranking dignitaries:
Tiếp Dẫn Đạo Nhơn 
Chưởng Ấn 
Cải Trạng 
Giáo Đạo  
Thừa Sử 
Truyền Trạng
Sĩ Tải
Luật Sự

Adherents must pass a qualifying examination to become a Luật Sự. Adherents will be promote to the next rank with enough required experience. Unlike Cửu Trùng Đài, where an adherent can be promoted to as high as Giáo Tông, Hiệp Thiên Đài only allows believers to achieve the ranks of Thời Quân. After Hộ Pháp Phạm Công Tắc, Thượng Phẩm Cao Quỳnh Cư and Thượng Sanh Cao Hoài Sang, there are no replacements designed.

Hiệp Thiên Đài’s religious functions
Hiệp Thiên Đài is the body which can:
establish, monitor and modify the Cao Đài legislations.
set up the religious courts of appeals.
qualify an applicant to get a higher rankexo.
interrogate the religious law violators. 
offer training sessions in Cao Đài laws. 
operate foreign missionary. 
manage the Meditation Houses. 
hold spiritual sessions to communicate with heaven.

Exoteric sense
Cao Đài originates in the spirit communication between man and spiritual beings. At the beginning, it was the dignitaries in Hiệp Thiên Đài, also appointed mediums by God, who received the spirit messages from heaven. Consequently, all of the scriptures as well as Cao Đài Law come from Hiệp Thiên Đài. Playing an important role in the establishment or modification of other Cao Đài laws, Hiệp Thiên Đài is very important in Cao Đài Church, like the brain in a human body.

Esoteric sense
Caodaiists are taught that everything in Cao Đài contains a method of esoteric practices. As a result, the structure and organization of Cao Dai Church is not an exception.

According to Cao Đài scriptures, Cửu Trùng Đài represents the body of an individual. Also, Hiệp Thiên Đài symbolizes the mind, and Bát Quái Đài the soul. To survive, an individual has to possess all of these parts. Appropriately collaborating, these will give the individual good health and intelligence. Especially, practicing at the utmost level, that individual can reach the status of enlightenment which Caodaiists call “uniting with God”. That will be the groundwork for Caodaiists to find the way out of the miserable recycle of birth and death.

It is believed by Caodaiists that the statues of Hộ Pháp, Thượng Sanh and Thượng Phẩm on the Seven-Snake Head- Pedestal inside the Tây Ninh Holy See contain metaphoric details of one of the practices that help them to rejoin God the Father in Heaven.

References
Cao Đài Law – Tây Ninh Holy See.
Cao Đài Scriptures – Tây Ninh Holy See
The Constitution of Hiệp Thiên Đài –Tây Ninh Holy See.
Sermons by Hộ Pháp – The Group of Stenographers in Tây Ninh Holy See.

Religion in Vietnam
Caodaism